James Hogan may refer to:

 James Hogan (American football) (1876–1910), Irish college football player
 James Hogan (businessman) (born 1956), airline executive
 James Hogan (guitarist) (born 1974), American guitarist
 James Hogan (Saskatchewan politician) (1872–1935), politician in Saskatchewan, Canada
 James Hogan (trade unionist), prominent official in the American Railway Union
 James Francis Hogan (1855–1924), Member of Parliament for Mid Tipperary, 1893–1900
 James Humphries Hogan (1883–1948), English stained glass designer
 James J. Hogan (1837–1914), American politician
 James John Hogan (1911–2005), sixth Roman Catholic Bishop of Altoona-Johnstown, 1966–1986
 James P. Hogan (director) (1890–1943), American filmmaker
 James P. Hogan (writer) (1941–2010), British science fiction author
 James Thomas Hogan (1874–1953), New Zealand politician
 Jim Hogan (athlete) (1933–2015), Irish distance runner
 Jim Hogan (hurler) (1928–2010), Irish hurler
 Jimmy Hogan (1882–1974), British footballer

See also
 Hogan (disambiguation)